Baroda and Gujarat States Agency was a political agency of British India, managing the relations of the British government of the Bombay Presidency with a collection of princely states.

The political agent, who was also Collector of the British District of the Panchmahal, resided at Baroda (Vadodara).

History 

In 1933, the great Gaekwar Baroda State and other princely states of the Baroda Agency were merged with those of the agencies adjacent to the northern part of the Bombay Presidency, Rewa Kantha Agency, Surat Agency, Nasik Agency, Kaira Agency and Thana Agency, in order to form the Baroda and Gujarat States Agency.

On 5 November 1944 the Baroda and Gujarat States Agency was merged with the Western India States Agency (WISA) to form a larger Baroda, Western India and Gujarat States Agency. At Indian Independence, this would merge into Bombay State, ending up at its split in present Gujarat.

The Attachment Scheme 
The process of the 'attachment scheme' began from 1940 onwards in order to integrate the smallest princely states, estates and thanas. Baroda State was one of the main beneficiaries of this measure by being able to add about 15,000 km2 and half a million inhabitants to the state. The merged states were Pethapur on 1 February 1940, the Katosan Thana, with Deloli, Kalsapura, Maguna, Memadpura, Rampura, Ranipura, Tejpura, Varsora, the Palaj Taluka and both Ijpura States between June and July 1940. These were followed on 10 July 1943 by the states of Ambliara, Ghorasar, Ilol, Katosan, Khadal, Patdi, Punadra, Ranasan, Wasoda and Wao Also many small Talukas of the region were merged. On 24 July 1943 Sachodar State and a few small places that had no own jurisdiction were annexed. Finally, by December the small states of Bajana, Bhilka, Malpur, Mansa and Vadia followed suit.

Princely states 

The number of separate states was above 80, but most were minor or petty states. Many of them were under British protectorate or at least influence. By far the largest one was Baroda State, which received tribute from many small states. In Kathiawar, only ten more ranked as Salute states. Jafrabad State had formerly been part of the Baroda Agency and was transferred later to the Kathiawar Agency.

In 1931, their combined population was 3,760,800. Many of the inhabitants were.

Former Baroda Agency 
Salute state :
 Baroda State, title Maharaja Gaekwar, Hereditary salute of 21-guns

Non-salute states :

Ilol
 Nahara 
Sihora
 Jambughoda 
Palaj
 Derdi
 Noghavandar
 Vajiria
 Palasni
 Agar
 Mandwa
Derol
 Vithalgadh
 Bhadli 
Gadhula
 Hapa
 Gad Boriad
 Veja
 Rupal
Chotila
 Bhilodia
 Dadhalia
 Charkha
 Gabat

Former Rewa Kantha Agency 
Salute states :
 First Class : Rajpipla (Nandod), title Maharaja, Hereditary salute of 13-guns
 Second Class :
 Bari(y)a (Devgadh), title Maharaol, Hereditary salute of 9-guns (11 personal)
 Balasinor, title Nawab, Hereditary salute of 9-guns
 Chhota Udaipur, title Raja, Hereditary salute of 9-guns
 Lunavada (Lunawada), title Maharana, Hereditary salute of 9-guns
 Sant (Sunth), title Maharana, Hereditary salute of 9-guns

Non-salute states :
 Major Mehwas
 Chhota Udehpur (Mohan), Second Class
 Kadana, Third Class
 Sanjeli, Third Class, title Thakur
 Jambughoda (Narukot), Third Class
 Bhadarva (Bhadarwa), Third Class
Gad Boriad, Third Class (personal) / Fourth Class
 Mandwa, Third Class (personal) / Fourth Class
 Umet(h)a, Third (personal) / Fourth Class
 Shanor, Fourth Class
Vajiria, Fourth Class
 Vanmala, Fourth Class (personal) / Fifth Class
 Nangam, Fifth Class
 Sihora, Fourth Class
Pandu, Fifth Class

 minor Mehwas (petty (e)states), in two geographical divisions
Sankheda :

 Agar 
 Alwa 
 Bhilodia :
Motisinghji,
Chhatarsinghji
 Bihora 
 Chorangla 
 Dudhpur 
 Chudesar 
 Jiral Kamsoli 
 Nalia
 Naswadi 
Palasni
 Pantalavdi : 
 Akbar Khan,
 Kesar Khan 
 Rampura 
 Regan 
 Sindiapura 
 Uchad 
 Vadia (Virampura) 
 Vasan Sewada 
 Vasan Virpur 
 Vo(h)ra 

Pandu (incl. three Dorka estates) :

Amrapur
 Angadh 
 Chhaliar 
 Dhari 
 Dorka 
 Gotardi
 Itwad 
 Jesa 
 Jumkha 
 Kalsa Pagi nu Muvadu 
 Kanoda  
 Litter Gothda 
 Mevli 
 Moka Pagi nu Muvadu 
 Moti Varnol 
 Nani Varnol 
 Poicha 
 Rayka (Raika)
 Rajpur, 
 Vakhtapur
 Varnolmal

Minor former Agencies

Former Surat Agency
Salute states :
 Dharampur, title Raja, Hereditary salute of 9-guns (11 personal)
 Sachin, title Nawab, Hereditary salute of 9-guns

Non-salute state : 
 Bansda

Other:
 The Dangs

Former Kaira Agency
Salute state :
 Cambay, title Nawab, Hereditary salute of 11-guns

Former Nasik Agency
 Non-salute state : Surgana

Former Thana Agency
Salute state :
 Jawhar, title Maharaja, Hereditary salute of 9-guns (13 personal and local) in first and second world war

See also 
 Bombay Presidency

References 

History of Gujarat
Bombay Presidency
Agencies of British India
1937 establishments in India
1944 disestablishments in India